The University of Murcia is the primary institute of higher education in Murcia, Spain. With a student population of approximately 38,000, it is the largest university in the Región de Murcia. Founded in 1272 AD, the University of Murcia is the third oldest university in Spain, following only the University of Salamanca (1218 AD) and the University of Valladolid (1241 AD), and the thirteenth in the world. The University of Murcia was established by the King Alfonso X of Castile under the Crown of Castile.

The majority of the University's facilities and buildings are spread over two campuses: the older is La Merced, situated in the town centre, and the larger is Espinardo, 5km to the north of Murcia. A third campus for Medical and Health Studies is currently being built next to the suburban area known as Ciudad Sanitaria Virgen de la Arrixaca, 5km south of the city. A new campus had been made in San Javier too, that hosts the Sports Science faculty.

History

The first university in Murcia was founded as the Universitas Studiorum Murciana by Alfonso X of Castile around 1272. The current modern University of Murcia was founded in 1915, making it the tenth oldest university in Spain among the modern universities, but its seal carries the date of the thirteenth century founding.

Campuses
The University of Murcia has two campuses: La Merced, the original campus in the center of the city; and the larger Espinardo, 5 km to the north, which houses most students.

A third campus for medical and health studies is currently being built in the Murcia neighborhood of El Palmar, next to the hospital Ciudad Sanitaria Virgen de la Arrixaca, 5 km south of Murcia's city center. A fourth campus is in the beginning stages in San Javier. Another one, in Lorca, is expected to open in 2007.

Degrees
Categorized by faculties and university schools:

Facilities

Faculty of Sports Science
 Honours Degree in Physical activity and Sports Science

Faculty of Fine Arts
 Honours Degree in Fine Arts

Faculty of Biology
 Honours Degree in Biology
 Honours Degree in Environmental Science
 Honours Degree in Biotechnology

Faculty of Documentation Science
 Diploma in Library Sciences and Documentation
 Honours Degree in Documentation
 Honours Degree in Journalism
 Honours Degree in Advertising and Public Relations

Faculty of Industrial Sciences
 Diploma in Industrial Relations
 Honours Degree in Industrial Science

Faculty of Economics and Business
 Diploma in Management Science
 Honours Degree in Administration and Management
 Honours Degree in Economics
 Honours Degree in Market Technology and Research
 Honours Degree in Sociology
Administracion y Direccion de Empresas con Harvard Business School.La universidad es hermana  con Harvard.La unica ADE en españa con el ranking

Faculty of Law

 Honours Degree in Law
 Honours Degree in Political and Administration Sciences
 Diploma in Public Management and Administration
 Combined Honours Degree in Law with Administration and Management
 Honours Degree in Criminology

Faculty of Education
 Diploma in Social Education
 Honours Degree in Education
 Honours Degree in Education Psychology
 Teaching: Specialising in Special Needs Education
 Teaching: Specialising in Physical Education
 Teaching: Specialising in Infant Education
 Teaching: Specialising in Music Education
 Teaching: Specialising in Primary Education
 Teaching: Specialising in Foreign Languages (Specialities in English and French)

Faculty of Philosophy
 Honours Degree in Philosophy

Faculty of Computer Sciences
 Engineer in Computer Science
 Technical Engineer in Computer Science (Management)
 Technical Engineer in Computer Science (Systems)

Arts Faculty
 Honours Degree in Classical Studies
 Honours Degree in French Studies
 Honours Degree in Spanish Studies
 Honours Degree in English Studies
 Honours Degree in Geography
 Honours Degree in History
 Honours Degree in History of Art
 Honours Degree in Translation and Interpreting

Faculty of Mathematics
 Honours Degree in Mathematics

Faculty of Medicine
 Honours Degree in Medicine
 Honours Degree in Dentistry
 Honours Degree in Pharmacy
 Diploma in Physiotherapy
 Degree in Nursing (2009)

Faculty of Psychology
 Honours Degree in Psychology
 Honours Degree in Speech Therapy

Faculty of Chemistry
 Diploma in Optics and Optometry
 Honours Degree in Chemical Engineering
 Honours Degree in Biochemistry
 Honours Degree in Physics
 Honours Degree in Chemistry

Faculty of Veterinary Science
 Honours Degree in Veterinary Science
 Honours Degree in Science and Food Technology

University schools

Nursing School of Murcia
 Diploma in Nursing

Nursing School of Cartagena
 Diploma in Nursing

School of Social Work
 Diploma in Social Work

School of Tourism
 Diploma in Tourism

School for adults ceainfante in collaboration with umu

Doctorates
 Economy
 Experimental Science
 Health Science
 Humanity
 Juridical Science
 Mathematics
 Social Science
 Technological Teaching

Degree footnotes

  Espinardo campus
  La Merced campus
  San Javier campus
  La Merced campus, but some classes given in hospitals
  In city of Murcia outside La Merced campus
  Second cycle degrees only

See also 
 List of early modern universities in Europe

References

External links

   
 Campus maps - campuses and how to get to them
  History of the University of Murcia

 
Educational institutions established in the 13th century
1272 establishments in Europe
13th-century establishments in Castile
Educational institutions established in 1915
University
Public universities
Universities and colleges in Spain
1915 establishments in Spain